KDDI India Private Limited headquartered in Gurgaon, India is a subsidiary of Japanese Telecommunication giant KDDI Corporation. And a Fortune 500 corporation The company first entered the Indian market in January 2004 and has since worked closely with the Indian Japanese Industries, In an alliance with local partner Indo-Fuji Information Technology Private Limited, since then, as well as supporting Japanese customers KDDI opened an office of KDDI Singapore in Delhi, in July 2006.
KDDI currently has offices in the 7 cities of Bangalore, Chennai, Gurgaon, Mumbai, Neemrana, Ahmedabad, and New Delhi. On 19 September 2007 it official started its corporate office in New Delhi.
Since its entry into India, KDDI has focused on some key objectives:
Commercial communications consulting,
SI/maintenance,
Sales and support for KDDI Group's international network services, etc.

KDDI India Private Limited's main field of business include commercial communications consulting, SI/maintenance, sales and support for KDDI Group's international network services, etc.

References 

KDDI
Indian subsidiaries of foreign companies
Telecommunications companies of India